Ratchathewi station is a BTS skytrain station, on the Sukhumvit Line in Ratchathewi District, Bangkok, Thailand. The station is located on Phaya Thai Road to the south of Ratchathewi intersection, about 10 minutes walk to Pantip Plaza on the way to Pratunam market. The station is also linked by a skybridge to Asia Hotel (where the Calypso Cabaret Shows are held), and by escalators and stairs to a recently created area known as Co-Co Walk that houses several relatively low cost restaurants and bars used mostly by the locals, some "antique" shops, and the one remaining software vendor displaced from Hollywood Street that occupied the rear of the site that formerly hosted a theatre/cimema; Co-Co Walk adjoins the Hollywood Arcade that appears to no longer function as retail premises.

Facilities
 Khlong Saen Saep Express Boat service at Saphan Hua Chang (or Ratchathewi) Pier (southern side of Hua Chang bridge) to Pratunam market and Golden Mount

See also
 Bangkok Skytrain

BTS Skytrain stations